Guérin-Kouka may refer to:

Guérin-Kouka, Bassar, a village in Togo
Guérin-Kouka, Dankpen, a city in Togo

See also
Guerin (disambiguation)
Kouka (disambiguation)